Louis Boudan (16??–17??) was an artist who worked for François Roger de Gaignières, a French genealogist, antiquary and collector who was active in the late 17th and early 18th centuries.

Boudan carried out commissions for de Gaignières for over 30 years. Most of his work for de Gaignières was done between 1695 and 1715 when he, de Gaignières and the latter's secretary, Barthélemy Remy, toured France to carry out a survey of historical monuments. Boudan's work makes up the bulk of the Recueil de Gaignières, a collection of engravings gathered by de Gaignières over the course of his life. It was donated to Louis XIV and most of the folio plates created for de Gaignières by Boudan are today held by the Bibliothèque nationale de France.

Gallery

References

17th-century French painters
French male painters
18th-century French painters
18th-century French male artists